Fumarole Bay is a bay on the southwest side of Port Foster in the interior of Deception Island, in the South Shetland Islands. Having a similar name in the same island is the Vapour Col.

The bay is part of the larger, enclosed water of Port Foster.  It was named "Bahia 1 de Mayo" or "Bahia Primero de Mayo" by the Argentine Antarctic Expedition of 1942–43, after the 1 de Mayo, an expedition ship which visited Deception Island in 1942 and 1943; she sank off the coast of Argentina on 5 February 1944.

The Falkland Islands Dependencies Survey carried out a full survey in 1953-54.  Aerial photography was carried out by the Falkland Islands and Dependencies Aerial Survey Expedition of 1956-57.  After this, the bay was named 'Fumarole Bay' because the most active fumarole on the island is situated here.

Fumaroles at the bay are in the temperature range of 100-107 °C.

See also
Wensleydale Beacon

References

SCAR Composite Antarctic Gazetteer

Bays of the South Shetland Islands
Geography of Deception Island